The Departmental Council of Vaucluse is the deliberative assembly of the French department of Vaucluse. The president of the council is Dominique Santoni (LR), since 2021.

Composition

Current elected officials 
The departmental council includes 34 departmental councilors from the 17 cantons of Vaucluse.

Presidents

Vice-presidents

Organization and competencies

Espaces Départemental des Solidarités 
The Vaucluse departmental council manages 16 Espaces Départemental des Solidarités (EDeS or ). These EDeS have four essential tasks: prevention of exclusion; maternal and infantile protection (medical, psychological, social and educational prevention for the health of future parents and children, actions for children at risk and prevention of ill-treatment, prevention actions, screening for disabilities in children aged 0 to 6, approval and training of childminders); assistance for the elderly and disabled; and health prevention and health actions.

Decentralized services 
All the services of the Vaucluse departmental council are relayed to 5 Houses of the Department in the municipalities of Apt, Orange, L'Isle-sur-la-Sorgue, Carpentras and Sault where help and information are offered to facilitate the daily life of the inhabitants.

References 

Politics of France
Vaucluse
Vaucluse